Gladhouse Reservoir, formerly known as Moorfoot Loch, is a reservoir in Midlothian, Scotland, five miles (8 km) south of Penicuik. It is the most southerly reservoir in Midlothian, as well as being the largest area of freshwater in the Lothians. It is used to supply Edinburgh with drinking water.

History
It was created in 1879 by the engineer James Leslie (1801–1889) and is the oldest of the reservoirs built in the catchment of the River South Esk. It was constructed to supply Edinburgh with water, the older and smaller reservoirs in the Pentland Hills being unable to meet the city's needs.

Description
Gladhouse Reservoir covers an area of  meaning it is the largest freshwater area in the Lothians. The dam and associated construction were made out of pink sandstone and was designed to contain up to "1700 million gallons". At the time this was regarded as a notable feat of engineering. It is the most southerly of all the reservoirs in the Lothians.

Fishing
Gladhouse Reservoir is stocked with brown trout and is a popular site for fishing.

Wildlife interest
Gladhouse Reservoir is an important roost site for wintering populations of pink-footed goose and has a large population of greylag goose. It has been designated a Ramsar site because of its internationally important counts of pink-footed goose. Mallard, tufted duck, teal, coot, common moorhen, great crested grebe and little grebe have all bred. In winter there are populations of mallard, teal, wigeon and tufted duck.

See also
Edgelaw Reservoir
Glencorse Reservoir
List of reservoirs and dams in the United Kingdom

References

External links

Ordnance Survey - Gladhouse Reservoir map
Ordnance Survey - Gladhouse Reservoir, Temple Circuit walk
Excavation of three long cists at Gladhouse Reservoir

Reservoirs in Midlothian
Sites of Special Scientific Interest in Mid and East Lothian
Ramsar sites in Scotland
RGladhouse